Blizky Island is an island that is part of the Russian Severnaya Zemlya in the Laptev Sea.
Administratively it is part of the district of the Krasnoyarsk Krai Taymyr in Siberian Federal District.

Geography
The island is situated in the eastern part of the archipelago, in the east coast of Bolshevik Island, separated from it by a narrow channel. Blizky lies in the northern part of Neudach Bay (бухта Неудач) close to the mouth of the Neogidannoi River (река  Неожиданной). To the northeast, at a distance of 4 km, lies the island named Morskoy.

Blizky has a rounded shape with a diameter of just over 2 km, its height does not exceed 6 m. In the north-west, near the coast, there is a small lagoon. At the north is a geodetic point.

See also
List of islands of Russia

References

Islands of Severnaya Zemlya
Islands of the Laptev Sea